The Museum of the White War in Adamello is an Italian museum located in Temù, in the Upper Val Camonica, in the province of Brescia. It is devoted to the conservation and valorization of military-historic heritage coming from the First world war and especially from the so-called White War in Adamello-Presanella which was the Italian front between Stelvio Pass and Garda Lake during that war.

Notes

References 

 Belotti Walter, Le testimonianze della Grande Guerra nel settore bresciano del Parco Nazionale dello Stelvio, Parco Nazionale dello Stelvio, 2001
 Paolo Robbiati, Guerra Bianca Ortles - Cevedale - Adamello 1915–1916, Edizioni Mursia

Museums in Italy